The Buffalo Bisons were a Major League Baseball franchise based in Buffalo, New York.  The team existed for one season, 1890, and played in the Players' League. The Bisons played their home games at Olympic Park. Hall of Famer Connie Mack was part owner and catcher for the Bisons.

In their only year as a major league franchise, the Bisons finished the 1890 season with a 36-96 record, last place in the PL. Jack Rowe managed the majority of the team's games, with 99 games, and Jay Faatz managed 33 games. Dummy Hoy led Buffalo with a .298 batting average, and both Bert Cunningham and George Haddock led the team with 9 wins.

Keys

List of players

External links
Baseball-Reference

References

Major League Baseball all-time rosters